Triveni is a rural municipality located in Western Rukum District of Karnali Province of Nepal.

Demographics
At the time of the 2011 Nepal census, 99.8% of the population in Triveni Rural Municipality spoke Nepali and 0.1% Urdu as their first language; 0.1% spoke other languages.

In terms of ethnicity/caste, 68.5% were Chhetri, 11.7% Magar, 11.6% Kami, 3.5% Damai/Dholi, 2.9% Thakuri, 1.1% Hill Brahmin, 0.3% Badi, 0.2% Sarki,  0.1% Musalman and 0.1% others.

In terms of religion, 99.3% were Hindu, 0.5% Christian, 0.1% Muslim and 0,1% others.

References

External links
 Official website

Populated places in Western Rukum District
Rural municipalities in Karnali Province
Rural municipalities of Nepal established in 2017